Helambu is a rural municipality and former village development committee located in Sindhupalchok District of Bagmati Province of central Nepal.

At the time of the 1991 Nepal census, it had a population of 2679.

Helambu is a part of the Helambu Region.

References

External links
 Official website

Populated places in Sindhupalchowk District
Rural municipalities in Sindhupalchowk District
Rural municipalities of Nepal established in 2017